Dynamedion GbR is a German music composition and production company based in Mainz. Founded in 2000 by composers Pierre Langer and Tilman Sillescu, Dynamedion specialises in composing music for video games. The group has won several industry awards, including Best German Soundtrack in 2004, 2005 and 2007 at the German Game Developers Awards, and Best Main Theme 2007 at the GANG Awards.

History 
Dynamedion's founders, Pierre Langer and Tilman Sillescu, both composers with a Bachelor of Musical Arts, Arranging and Composing degree, met while employed as teachers at the Universität Mainz. The two wanted to expand their creative abilities, leading Langer to suggest creating music for video games. The duo experimented with several minor projects before founding Dynamedion in 2000. The company started out developing a game in Adobe Flash, but dropped its development when approached by Volker Wertich, who asked them to work on his then-upcoming game, SpellForce: The Order of Dawn. In 2009, the company launched Boom Library, a subsidiary company that creates original sound effects.

Works

References

External links 
 

Video game composers